The Driggs Dart was an American-built light sporting aircraft of the late 1920s.

Development

Ivan Driggs designed the Dart I single-seat high-wing monoplane in 1926. In 1927 he developed the design into the two-seat Dart II, which was a sesquiplane - a biplane whose lower wing area is less than 50% of the area of the upper wing.

Operational history

Three examples of the Dart I monoplane were constructed and the type won the 1926 Ford Air Tour category for light planes. One was tested by the U.S. Army Air Corps as an observation aircraft, but no orders were received.

The Dart II sesquiplane followed in 1927, at least four examples being built by Driggs and some further planes by amateur constructors from plans during the early 1930s. A Dart II is maintained in airworthy condition by the Historic Aircraft Restoration Museum at Dauster Field Creve Coeur, Missouri near St Louis.

Variants

Dart I  Single-seat parasol monoplane powered by a  Anzani 3 air-cooled radial engine.

Dart II  Two-seat sesquiplane powered by a  Anzani 3 or Salmson AD.9 air-cooled radial piston engine.

Specifications (Dart II Anzani engine)

References

External links
Aerofiles.com

1920s United States sport aircraft
Sesquiplanes
Single-engined tractor aircraft
Aircraft first flown in 1926
High-wing aircraft